The 1958 NAIA men's basketball tournament was held in March at Municipal Auditorium in Kansas City, Missouri. The 21st annual NAIA basketball tournament featured 32 teams playing in a single-elimination format.

The championship game featured returning champions, Tennessee State University who defeated the Western Illinois University. The Tigers won over the Leathernecks, it would be the third time a team won back-to-back championships. Tennessee State is the 5th school to win 2 National Titles, joining University of Central Missouri, Hamline University, Indiana State University and Southwest Missouri State. It was the second year in a row with an upset in the Championship Game. The 3rd-place game featured Texas Southern University and Georgetown College (Ky.)
It was the first year the Charles Stevenson Hustle Award was awarded. It went to Bill McAfoos of Western Illinois.

Awards and honors
Many of the records set by the 1958 tournament have been broken, and many of the awards were established much later:
Leading scorer est. 1963
Leading rebounder est. 1963
Player of the Year est. 1994
Most consecutive tournament victories; continues: 18 overall; 5 in 1958, Tennessee State, 1957-58-59-60
All-time leading scorers; third appearance: Dick Barnett, 3rd, Tennessee State (1956,57,58,59) 18 games, 186 field goals, 79 free throws, 451 total points 25.1 average per game, Charles Curtis, 8th, Pacific Lutheran (Wash.) (1956,57,58,59) 14 games 101 field goals,  85 free throws, 287 total points, 20.5 average per game, Roger Iverson, 20th, Pacific Lutheran (1956,57,58,59) 14 games, 109 field goals, 23 free throws, 241 total points, 17.2 average per game, and John Barnhill, 21st, Tennessee State (1956,57,58,59) 17 games, 104 field goals, 27 free throws, 235 total points, 13.8 average per game.
All-time leading scorer; final appearance: Bennie Swain, 6th Texas Southern (1955,56,57,58) 15 games, 119 field goals, 64 free throws, 302 total points, 20.1 average per game.

1958 NAIA bracket

  * denotes overtime.

3rd-place game
The third-place game featured the losing teams from the national semifinalist to determine 3rd and 4th places in the tournament. This game was played until 1988.

See also
 1958 NCAA University Division basketball tournament
 1958 NCAA College Division basketball tournament

References

NAIA Men's Basketball Championship
Tournament
NAIA men's basketball tournament
NAIA men's basketball tournament